Jimmy Kerr (1919 – 27 May 2001) was a Scottish football goalkeeper, who played for Hibernian and Queen of the South.

Career 
Kerr appeared for Hibernian in the 1947 Scottish Cup Final and helped the club win the 1947–48 Scottish League championship. His good form for Hibs caused understudy George Farm to leave Hibs for Blackpool.

After retiring as a player, Kerr went into business with Tom Hart. Kerr, like Hart, served on the Hibs board of directors.

References

External links 
Jimmy Kerr, www.ihibs.co.uk

1919 births
2001 deaths
Footballers from East Lothian
Scottish footballers
Association football goalkeepers
Hibernian F.C. players
Queen of the South F.C. players
Scottish Football League players
Directors of football clubs in Scotland
Hibernian F.C. directors and chairmen
Date of birth missing
Place of death missing
People from Ormiston
20th-century Scottish businesspeople